This is a list of all captains of the Sydney Swans (previously the South Melbourne Football Club), an Australian rules football club in the Australian Football League (AFL) and AFL Women's.

VFL/AFL

AFL Women's

See also

References

External links
Sydney Swans Honour Roll

Lists of Australian Football League captains
Captains
Sydney-sport-related lists